Ascot Racecourse is the major racecourse in Perth, Western Australia, situated approximately  east of the Perth central business district, with the headquarters of the Perth Racing positioned directly opposite.

It is regarded as the "grand old lady" of Australian racecourses. It has a  track with modern, well drained turf, and a  track inclining straight regarded by experts as the most severe test of stayers in Australia.

History
In 1848 a race meeting was held on  Hardey's "Grove Farm" alongside the Swan River. Soon afterwards a site was selected for a permanent course on Hardey's propertythis became the Perth Race Course (later Ascot Racecourse). In 1852, the West Australian Turf Club was formed.

The inaugural Perth Cup was held in 1887.

In 1885 a railway was constructed to the northern side of Swan River opposite the racecourse. The railway was extended across the river to the racecourse in 1897. The railway and station were removed in 1957.

Races
The following is a list of Group races which are run at Ascot Racecourse.

Key
 hcp - handicap
 sw - set weights
 wfa - weight for age

Culture
The Perth Cup is Perth's feature event on the racing calendar held annually either on New Year's Day or a nearby Saturday.

See also
 Belmont Park, Perth Racing's alternate season track to Ascot
 Ascot Racecourse in the United Kingdom.

References

Horse racing venues in Australia
Sports venues in Perth, Western Australia
Ascot, Western Australia